Shadrack Kiptoo Biwott (born February 15, 1985 in Kenya) is a Kenyan-born American long-distance runner.

Early life
Biwott grew up in Eldoret in the Rift Valley Province of Kenya and moved to the United States in 2002 to attend La Cueva High School in Albuquerque, New Mexico. On November 8, 2003, he placed first in the state with a time of 15:23.00 at the New Mexico State Cross Country Championships.

College career 
Biwott graduated from the University of Oregon where he was an multiple time All-American.

Biwott was an athlete of the Year for cross country lead the Oregon Ducks to an impressive group of five Men of Oregon All-Americans returning for the defending NCAA Division 1 national team champion in 2008.

Biwott earned 2007 cross country honors and was named the Pac-10 Athlete of the Year for winning his first Pac-10 xc title.

Biwott debut at 2007 Stanford Cardinal track and field Invitational earning an NCAA provisional mark in 10,000 meters in 29:00.52.

Professional career
After graduating from Oregon, Biwott signed to train on the track under coach Mark Rowland led Oregon Track Club until 2012.

Biwott became a U.S. citizen and moved to Folsom in 2012.

Biwott placed 3rd in 2013 Medtronic Twin Cities Marathon in Minnesota in 2:13:26.

Biwott was sponsored by ASICS in 2014.

Biwott competed at the 2014 IAAF World Half Marathon Championships where he finished 39th.

Biwott placed 14th in 2:12:55 at 2014 BMW Frankfurt Marathon.

Biwott placed 7th at the Los Angeles U.S. Olympic Trials Marathon in 2:15:23.

He finished 5th at the 2016 New York City Marathon.

At the 2017 Boston Marathon he placed 4th.

Biwott joined the Hanson Brooks Project on April 27, 2017.

At the 2018 Boston Marathon he placed 3rd.

At the 2019 Boston Marathon he placed 15th.

References

External links

Living people
African-American male track and field athletes
Oregon Ducks men's track and field athletes
Oregon Ducks men's cross country runners
American male long-distance runners
American male marathon runners
Sportspeople from New Mexico
1985 births
21st-century African-American sportspeople
20th-century African-American people
People from Uasin Gishu County